MIKTA is an informal middle power partnership between Mexico, Indonesia, South Korea, Turkey, and Australia. It is led by the Foreign Ministers. It was created in 2013 on the sidelines of the United Nations General Assembly in New York City and aims to support effective global governance.

The group's diverse membership – in terms of culture, socio-economic structure and geography – lends it a unique perspective. It is a cross-regional, values-based partnership with several key commonalities. Importantly, all member states are G20 economies with similar GDP and an interest in ensuring global governance systems work for all states regardless of size and influence. These similarities provide a strong foundation for mutual cooperation.

Furthermore, the diversity within the partnership allows the members to share their knowledge and perspectives resulting from varied experiences.

Nature of MIKTA Partnership

Consultative Platform 
A key aspect that distinguishes MIKTA from other multilateral groups is that it is an informal consultative platform, rather than a formal organisation. It provides a space for dialogue and innovative diplomacy to address current global issues. Information sharing and increased mutual understanding are central features of MIKTA.

Strengths 
One of MIKTA's key strengths is its flexibility. It provides an informal environment in which topical issues can be discussed, without pressure to reach a consensus. It seeks to assume an adaptable form of multilateral cooperation, in contrast to traditional ‘blocs’, so as to afford an enhanced ability to maneuver effective global governance in a world of fast-paced developments.

As all MIKTA members are also members of broader international organisations, such as the United Nations, World Trade Organization and G20, issues relevant to those forums can form the topics of consultation in MIKTA. This may involve cooperating on commitments made within those organisations or, on occasion, committing to additional goals or standards. It also provides an opportunity for these regional powers to engage in dialogue independently of larger economic powers.

Meetings 
The MIKTA Foreign Ministers meet regularly. A retreat-style meeting is held annually in the chairing country. The members have also met on the sidelines of the UN General Assembly Leader's Week and the G20.

Chair 
The chair of MIKTA rotates annually.

Areas of Interest 
MIKTA has agreed to work together on a number of thematic issues.

These include:
 international energy governance and energy access;
 counter-terrorism and security;
 peacekeeping;
 trade and the economy;
 gender equality;
 good governance; and
 sustainable development.

Activities 
MIKTA engages in a variety of activities in line with its core areas of interest. These include sharing information, releasing joint statements, non-papers that contribute to progress on multilateral issues, advocating common messages across each member's networks, workshops for technical experts and side events to support outcomes at major international events.

Major activities of MIKTA thus far are listed below.
 Joint communiqués
 from 6 Foreign Ministers’ Meetings
 Joint statements
 North Korean nuclear test (Jan 2016)
 Terrorist attack in Turkey (Oct 2015)
 Climate change (Sept 2015)
 Financing for development (July 2015)
 Commemorating International Women's Day (March 2015)
 Ebola outbreak and global health (Sept 2014)
 Downing of Malaysia Airlines Flight MH17 (July 2014)
 Joint op-ed (Jan 2015)
 Speakers’ Consultations
 Exchange programs
 Exchange of Diplomats (Ankara and Istanbul, Feb 2016)
 Exchange of Young Professionals (Seoul, July 2015)
 Exchange of Journalists (Seoul, May 2015)
 Workshops
 MIKTA Workshop on Electronic Commerce (Geneva, 5 July 2016)
 Third MIKTA Development Cooperation Workshop (Canberra, 1 April 2016)
 Second MIKTA Development Cooperation Workshop (Seoul, 11 May 2015)
 Academics network
 MIKTA Academic Conference: Unlocking Global Innovation (Canberra, April 14–15, 2016)
 The 1st MIKTA Academic Network Conference: Partnership in Knowledge for Better Global Governance (Seoul, May 11–12, 2015)
(Participating academic institutions: CIDE of Mexico, The Habibie Center of Indonesia, IFANS of the Republic of Korea, TEPAV of Turkey, and Coral Bell School, ANU of Australia.)

Leaders

Member country data

MIKTA Speakers' Consultation 
MIKTA was formed under Seoul's leadership in 2013 and is an acronym of the names of its five member countries—Mexico, Indonesia, South Korea, Turkey, and Australia.

The 2015 MIKTA Speakers' Consultation was held in Seoul, Korea from July 1–5. The Speaker of the National Assembly of Seoul Korea Chung Ui-hwa proposed the meeting and arranged for the remaining countries to arrive for the consultation. At the Plenary Session, which took place on July 2, the Speakers and other delegates of the MIKTA parliaments discussed the role of each country's parliaments in implementing and supporting core values such as the Sustainable Development Goals, regional issues facing the MIKTA countries, and the 70th anniversary of the national division and the peaceful reunification of the Korean Peninsula. The Speakers cooperated and concurred that the MIKTA Speakers' Consultation should serve as one of the main platforms that contribute to the development of each respective country and agreed to make efforts to forge cooperative relations with relevant government ministries to assist MIKTA in contributing to good global governance. The Consultation concluded with the adoption of the Joint Statement in which the Speakers agreed to build a unified network and to consider holding a 2nd MIKTA Speakers’ Consultation in 2016.

See also
 List of country groupings
 List of multilateral free-trade agreements
 BRICS

References

Geopolitical rivalry
Intergovernmental organizations
International relations